The Spring Mountain District AVA is an American Viticultural Area located in the Napa Valley AVA in California. Spring Mountain District AVA was officially established as an American Viticulture Area in 1993. Given the small crop yields on hillsides, the region represents less than 2% of Napa Valley wine. Currently the region has just over 30 winegrowers.

The appellation sits on steep terraces of the Mayacamas Mountains that separate Napa Valley from Sonoma Valley and the Santa Rosa Plain. It lies in a northwestern portion of the Napa Valley above and behind the town of Saint Helena. The boundaries of the appellation extend from the top of the ridgeline on the western edge, tracing the Sonoma/Napa County border.  From the ridgeline the boundaries extend down to the  contour line at the eastern base of the hillside. The southern boundary is Sulphur Creek and one of its tributaries, while the northern boundary is Ritchie Creek.

The region has a predominantly eastern exposure.

Climate 

Local topography and regional weather patterns make the Spring Mountain District the coolest and wettest appellation within the Napa Valley. These same factors create a diurnal fluctuation in temperature in the summertime that differs from other regions of the Napa Valley.  Spring Mountain is only  to the east of the Pacific Ocean. The coastal waters of northern California are strongly influenced by the California Current, an icy flow of water that originates near the Aleutian Islands.  This cold current moderates the summer weather in the coastal valleys of Northern California.

Lying between the Spring Mountain appellation and the cold ocean current is a gap in the coastal mountains between Bodega and Tomales Bay and extending through the Santa Rosa Plain.  Summer heat in the interior of California creates a low pressure area that draws cold air from the coast through this coastal gap and across the broad Santa Rosa plain. This on-shore air movement is bumped north by Sonoma Mountain pushing the cold air flow towards Santa Rosa Creek, the Northern Mayacamas Mountains, and directly at the Spring Mountain District AVA. The ridge of the Spring Mountain District is lower than Bald Mountain to its south and Diamond Mountain to its north. This lower ridgeline allows the cool, moist coastal air to enter the Napa Valley spilling down over forest and the vineyards that lie on the slopes of Spring Mountain and moderating peak daily temperatures.

A typical summer afternoon on Spring Mountain is cool, sometimes with "waterfalls" of fog tumbling over the western ridge and down through the canyons of the district.  Into the evening, the cool air settles to the valley floor creating a cover of fog and warm air is lifted to the higher elevations. Nighttime temperature rise from this effect. Mornings warm more quickly on Spring Mountain than on the valley floor as most of the district lies above the morning fog line. The overall effect of this is moderately warm peak daily temperatures and moderately warm nighttime temperatures which keeps sugar accumulation in the berry in pace with flavor development.

The topography of the Spring Mountain District AVA also influences in the vineyards on the valley floor below it. While much of the Napa Valley depends on cooling from the San Pablo Bay, the vineyards in and around Saint Helena benefit from this second and direct source of coastal cooling that comes through the Spring Mountain District AVA. Also moderating summer temperatures in the appellation is the altitude of the vineyards; generally they are cooler at higher elevations. A final moderating influence is the district's predominantly eastern exposure which shades the district from the harsh afternoon sun. The topography influences climate over the entire year. Spring Mountain District AVA receives  to  more annual rainfall than the Napa Valley floor or the eastern slopes of the valley.

Soils 

Soil depths vary, but tend to be deeper than in nearby mountain terrain and shallower than on the valley floor. The region contains mostly residual upland soils with only a few areas of alluvial soils at the lower elevations. The soils are derived almost equally from Franciscan sedimentary rocks (sandstone and conglomerates) and Sonoma volcanic formations which are predominantly composed of Andesite. This equal mix of sedimentary and volcanic rocky soils distinguishes the region from adjacent mountain areas. To the north, in the Diamond Mountain area, soils are almost entirely of volcanic origin. To the south, in the Mount Veeder area, soils are primarily sedimentary.

Wine Production 

About 90% of the wine produced in the Spring Mountain District AVA is red. The predominating grape variety is Cabernet Sauvignon followed by Merlot. In addition to the other Bordelaise grape varieties of Cabernet Franc, Petit Verdot and Malbec, a few sites favor and support small plantings of Zinfandel, Syrah, Petite Sirah and on the coolest sites, even a little Pinot noir. Of the whites over half is Chardonnay. The other significant plantings of white grapes in the AVA are Sauvignon blanc and White Riesling.

History 

Early on, the name Spring Mountain was used in a regional context and did not refer to the name of a peak or prominent point, rather than a particularly verdant area with numerous springs, and drained by several small streams. The appellation was among the first locations in Napa Valley to receive recognition as a grape growing region.

While grapes may have been grown in the area as early as the American Civil War, the first documented planting is that of Charles Lemme, who cultivated the  La Perla Vineyard just south of York Creek in 1874. Steady growth followed. In the 1880s, Jacob and Frederick Beringer, who had already opened their historic winery near St. Helena, planted a vineyard on Spring Mountain. Later in the decade, Fortune Chevalier, a Frenchman who had come to San Francisco during the Gold Rush, planted  and built a stone winery.

Most notable among the early growers was wealthy San Francisco banker and financier Tiburcio Parrott, who established a vineyard that he named Miravalle and built a Victorian-style home that still stands on the property. In 1893, a local newspaper reported: "Old vineyardists asked him [Parrott] what he expected to do among those hills and rocks, and when told by Mr. Parrott that he expected to raise grapes and produce wine unsurpassed in the world, they laughed at him and told him his hopes would never be realized." Parrott's wines took first place at the San Francisco Midwinter Fair the following year and a gold medal at the World's Fair two years later. The historic La Perla, Chevalier and Miravalle vineyards are now part of Spring Mountain Vineyard.

Grape growing and winemaking declined in Spring Mountain from 1910 to 1940 due to the onset of phylloxera and Prohibition. The first reawakening of viticulture came in 1946, when Fred and Eleanor McCrea planted a small vineyard north of Mill Creek, and then in 1953 founded a legendary winery called Stony Hill. The resurgence began in earnest in the late 1960s and 1970s — with the founding of several wineries, including Ritchie Creek, Yverdon, Spring Mountain Vineyard, Smith-Madrone and Robert Keenan. The name Spring Mountain was first used as an origin on Cabernet Sauvignon wines produced by Ritchie Creek in 1974.

Vineyards & Wineries

 Barnett Vineyards
 Behrens Family Vineyard
 Cain Vineyard & Winery
 Castellucci
 Fantesca Estate & Winery
 Frias Family Vineyard
 Juslyn Vineyards
 Lokoya Estate
 Lüscher-Ballard Vineyard
 Marston Family Vineyard
 Newton Vineyard
 Paloma Vineyard
 Peacock Family Vineyard
 Philip Togni Vineyard
 Pride Mountain Vineyards
 Ritchie Creek Vineyard
 Robert Keenan Winery
 Sarocka Estate
 School House Vineyard
 Schweiger Vineyards and Winery
 Smith-Madrone Vineyards and Winery
 Spring Mountain Vineyard
 Stony Hill Vineyard
 Sherwin Family Vineyards
 Vineyard 7 & 8
 York Creek Vineyards

References

External links 
 Spring Mountain District, Napa Valley
 Spring Mountain District Association names new board officers, Napa Valley Register, June 11, 2018
 Spring Mountain Terroir by Paul W. Skinner, Ph.D*., Terra Spase, Inc.

American Viticultural Areas of the San Francisco Bay Area
Geography of Napa County, California
Mayacamas Mountains
American Viticultural Areas
1993 establishments in California